Sabrina Solis Martinez (born 30 August 1996) is a Mexican badminton player.

Achievements

Pan Am Championships 
Women's doubles

Mixed doubles

Central American and Caribbean Games 
Women's singles

Women's doubles

Mixed doubles

BWF International Challenge/Series (7 titles, 4 runners-up) 
Women's singles

Women's doubles

Mixed doubles

  BWF International Challenge tournament
  BWF International Series tournament
  BWF Future Series tournament

References

External links 
 
 

1996 births
Living people
People from San Luis Potosí City
Mexican female badminton players
Badminton players at the 2014 Summer Youth Olympics
Badminton players at the 2015 Pan American Games
Badminton players at the 2019 Pan American Games
Pan American Games competitors for Mexico
Competitors at the 2014 Central American and Caribbean Games
Competitors at the 2018 Central American and Caribbean Games
Central American and Caribbean Games gold medalists for Mexico
Central American and Caribbean Games silver medalists for Mexico
Central American and Caribbean Games bronze medalists for Mexico
Central American and Caribbean Games medalists in badminton
21st-century Mexican women